Alexandre Ramalingom (born 17 March 1993) is a professional footballer who plays as a forward for CS Sedan Ardennes. Born in France, he represents the Madagascar national team.

Club career
Ramalingom started his career in the amateur divisions of France with Marignane and Île-Rousse. He moved to AC Ajaccio in 2015, and made his senior debut with them in a 3–0 Ligue 2 loss to Stade de Reims on 20 March 2017.

On 23 June 2018, Ramalingom signed with Béziers. He debuted for Béziers in a 2–0 Ligue 2 win over AS Nancy on 27 July 2016, wherein he also scored his debut goal for the team.

Ramalingom joined R.E. Virton on 31 August 2019. Two months later, he was relegated to the club's B-team. He became a part of the first team again from start beginning of 2020. In September 2020 he returned to France with Sedan.

International career
Ramalingom was born in France and is of Réunionnais and Malagasy descent. He was called up to represent the Madagascar national team for Africa Cup of Nations qualifiers in March 2020. He debuted in a 4–1 friendly win to FC Swift Hesperange on 7 October 2020.

References

External links
 
 

1993 births
Living people
Sportspeople from Pontoise
Association football forwards
People with acquired Malagasy citizenship
Malagasy footballers
Madagascar international footballers
French footballers
French sportspeople of Malagasy descent
French people of Réunionnais descent
French expatriate footballers
AS Béziers (2007) players
AC Ajaccio players
Marignane Gignac Côte Bleue FC players
R.E. Virton players
CS Sedan Ardennes players
Ligue 2 players
Championnat National players
Championnat National 2 players
Championnat National 3 players
Challenger Pro League players
French expatriate sportspeople in Belgium
Expatriate footballers in Belgium
Footballers from Val-d'Oise